The following elections occurred in the year 2004.

Africa
 2004 Algerian presidential election
 2004 Botswana general election
 2004 Cameroonian presidential election
 2004 Comorian legislative election
 2004 Equatorial Guinean legislative election
 2004 Ghanaian parliamentary election
 2004 Ghanaian presidential election
 2004 Guinea-Bissau legislative election
 2004 Mahoran legislative election
 2004 Malawian general election
 2004 Mozambican general election
 2004 Namibian general election
 2004 Nigerien general election
 2004 Nigerien parliamentary election
 2004 Nigerien presidential election
 2004 South African general election

Asia
 2004 Afghan presidential election
 2004 Hong Kong legislative election
 2004 Indonesian legislative election
 2004 Indonesian presidential election
 2004 Iranian legislative election
 2004 Kazakhstani legislative election
 2004 Malaysian general election
 2004 Mongolian legislative election
 2004 Pakistani presidential election
 2004 Philippine general election
 2004 Republic of China legislative election (Taiwan)
 2004 Republic of China presidential election (Taiwan)
 2004 South Korean legislative election
 2004 Sri Lankan parliamentary election
 2004 Sri Lankan provincial council election
 2004 Turkish local elections
 2004–2005 Uzbekistani parliamentary election

India
 Indian general election in Arunachal Pradesh, 2004
 Indian general election in Kerala, 2004
 Indian general election in Madhya Pradesh, 2004
 Indian general election in Sikkim, 2004
 Indian general elections, 2004-Assam
 Indian general elections, 2004-Regional Scenarios
 Indian general election full results, 2004
 Indian general election in Andhra Pradesh, 2004
 Indian general election in Assam, 2004
 Indian general election in Bihar, 2004
 Indian general election in Chhattisgarh, 2004
 Indian general election in Haryana, 2004
 Indian general election in Manipur, 2004
 Indian general election in Tamil Nadu, 2004
 2004 Karnataka Legislative Assembly election
 2004 Maharashtra state assembly elections
 State Assembly elections in India, 2004

Indian general
 2004 Indian general election analysis
 India Shining
 Indian general election in Gujarat, 2004
 Indian general election in Karnataka, 2004
 Indian general election in National Capital Territory of Delhi, 2004
 2004 Indian general election
 Results of the 2004 Indian general election by parliamentary constituency
 Results of the 2004 Indian general election in Tamil Nadu by assembly constituents

Japan
 2004 Iwate gubernatorial election
 2004 Japanese House of Councillors election
 2004 Shinjuku local election

Malaysia
 2004 Malaysian general election

Philippines
 2004 Cebu City local elections
 2004 Philippine presidential election
 2004 Philippine Senate election

Russia
 Krasnodar Krai Head of Administration elections
 2004 Russian presidential election

Australia
 2004 Australian Capital Territory general election
 2004 Australian federal election
 'Not happy, John!' campaign
 2004 Dubbo state by-election
 2004 Queensland state election

Europe
 2004 Abkhazian presidential election
 2004 Belarusian parliamentary election
 2004 Belarusian referendum
 2004 Belgian regional elections
 2004 Bosnia and Herzegovina municipal elections
 2004 Cypriot Annan Plan referendum
 Elections in Alderney
 2004 European Parliament election in Slovenia
 2004 Faroese parliamentary election
 2004 Georgian presidential election
 2004 Georgian legislative election
 2004 Greek legislative election
 2004 Guernsey general election
 2004 Icelandic presidential election
 2004 Irish local elections
 2004 Irish presidential election
 2004 Kosovan parliamentary election
 2004 Lithuanian parliamentary election
 2004 Lithuanian presidential election
 2004 Luxembourgian legislative election
 2004 Macedonian autonomy referendum
 2004 Macedonian presidential election
 2004 Montenegrin municipal election
 2004 Romanian legislative election
 2004 Romanian local election
 2004 Romanian presidential election
 2004 Serbian presidential election
 2004 Slovak presidential election
 2004 Slovenian parliamentary election
 2004 South Ossetian parliamentary election
 2004 Turkish local elections
 2004 Ukrainian presidential election
 2004 Vojvodina parliamentary election

Austria
 2004 Austrian presidential election
 2004 European Parliament election in Austria
 2004 Vorarlberg state election

European Parliament
 2004 European Parliament election
 2004 European Parliament election in Austria
 2004 European Parliament election in Belgium
 2004 European Parliament election in Cyprus
 2004 European Parliament election in the Czech Republic
 2004 European Parliament election in Denmark
 2004 European Parliament election in Estonia
 2004 European Parliament election in Portugal
 2004 European Parliament election in Aosta Valley
 2004 European Parliament election in Lombardy
 2004 European Parliament election in Piedmont
 2004 European Parliament election in Sardinia
 2004 European Parliament election in Sicily
 2004 European Parliament election in Trentino-Alto Adige/Südtirol
 2004 European Parliament election in Veneto
 2004 European Parliament election in Finland
 2004 European Parliament election in France
 2004 European Parliament election in Germany
 2004 European Parliament election in Gibraltar
 2004 European Parliament election in Greece
 2004 European Parliament election in Hungary
 2004 European Parliament election in Ireland
 2004 European Parliament election in Italy
 2004 European Parliament election in Latvia
 2004 European Parliament election in Lithuania
 2004 European Parliament election in Luxembourg
 2004 European Parliament election in Malta
 2004 European Parliament election in the Netherlands
 2004 European Parliament election in Poland
 2004 European Parliament election in Slovakia
 2004 European Parliament election in Slovenia
 2004 European Parliament election in Spain
 2004 European Parliament election in Sweden
 2004 European Parliament election in the United Kingdom

Faroe Islands
 2004 Faroese general election

France
 2004 Alsace regional election
 2004 Auvergne regional election
 2004 Brittany regional election
 2004 Champagne-Ardenne regional election
 2004 European Parliament election in France
 2004 Franche-Comté regional election
 2004 French Polynesian legislative election
 2004 French regional elections
 2004 French Senate election
 2004 French cantonal elections
 2004 Île-de-France regional election
 2004 Poitou-Charentes regional election
 2004 Provence-Alpes-Côte d'Azur regional election
 2004 Rhône-Alpes regional election

Georgia
 2004 Georgian parliamentary election
 2004 Georgian presidential election

Germany
 2004 Brandenburg state election
 2004 European Parliament election in Germany
 2004 Hamburg state election
 2004 German presidential election
 2004 Saarland state election
 2004 Saxony state election
 2004 Thuringia state election

Greece
 2004 Greek legislative election

Iceland
 2004 Icelandic presidential election

Italy
 2004 European Parliament election in Aosta Valley
 2004 European Parliament election in Italy
 2004 European Parliament election in Lombardy
 2004 European Parliament election in Piedmont
 2004 European Parliament election in Sardinia
 2004 European Parliament election in Sicily
 2004 European Parliament election in Trentino-Alto Adige/Südtirol
 2004 European Parliament election in Veneto
 2004 Sardinian regional election

Kosovo
 2004 Kosovan parliamentary election

Lithuania
 2004 Lithuanian parliamentary election
 2004 Lithuanian presidential election
 2004 Luxembourg general election

Macedonia
 2004 Macedonian presidential election

Romania
 2004 Romanian general election

Russia
 Krasnodar Krai Head of Administration elections
 2004 Russian presidential election

San Marino
 2004 Sammarinese local elections

Slovakia
 2004 Slovak presidential election

Slovenia
 2004 Slovenian parliamentary election

South Ossetia
 South Ossetian parliamentary election

Spain
 2004 European Parliament election in Spain
 2004 Spanish general election

United Kingdom
 2004 United Kingdom elections
 2004 European Parliament election in the United Kingdom
 2004 Birmingham Hodge Hill by-election
 2004 Hartlepool by-election
 2004 Leicester South by-election
 2004 United Kingdom local elections
 2004 London Assembly election
 2004 London mayoral election
 2004 Ulster Unionist Party leadership election

United Kingdom local
 2004 United Kingdom local elections

English local
 2004 Adur Council election
 2004 Amber Valley Council election
 2004 Barnsley Council election
 2004 Barrow-in-Furness Council election
 2004 Bassetlaw Council election
 2004 Blackburn with Darwen Council election
 2004 Bolton Council election
 2004 Brentwood Council election
 2004 Broxbourne Council election
 2004 Burnley Council election
 2004 Calderdale Council election
 2004 Cheltenham Council election
 2004 Cherwell Council election
 2004 Chorley Council election
 2004 Coventry Council election
 2004 Craven Council election
 2004 Daventry Council election
 2004 Derby Council election
 2004 Eastleigh Council election
 2004 Ellesmere Port and Neston Council election
 2004 Epping Forest Council election
 2004 Fareham Council election
 2004 Gateshead Council election
 2004 Gosport Council election
 2004 Halton Council election
 2004 Harlow Council election
 2004 Hart Council election
 2004 Hastings Council election
 2004 Hull Council election
 2004 Hyndburn Council election
 2004 Ipswich Borough Council election
 2004 Knowsley Council election
 2004 Lincoln Council election
 2004 Liverpool Council election
 2004 Mole Valley Council election
 2004 Newcastle-under-Lyme Council election
 2004 North Tyneside Council election
 2004 Nuneaton and Bedworth Council election
 2004 Oxford City Council election
 2004 Penwith Council election
 2004 Portsmouth Council election
 2004 Preston Council election
 2004 Purbeck Council election
 2004 Redditch Council election
 2004 Rochdale Council election
 2004 Rochford Council election
 2004 Rossendale Council election
 2004 Rugby Council election
 2004 Runnymede Council election
 2004 Rushmoor Council election
 2004 Salford Council election
 2004 Sefton Council election
 2004 Sheffield Council election
 2004 Slough Council election
 2004 Solihull Council election
 2004 South Lakeland Council election
 2004 South Tyneside Council election
 2004 Southend-on-Sea Council election
 2004 St Albans Council election
 2004 St Helens Council election
 2004 Stevenage Council election
 2004 Stratford-on-Avon Council election
 2004 Swindon Council election
 2004 Tamworth Council election
 2004 Tandridge Council election
 2004 Three Rivers Council election
 2004 Thurrock Council election
 2004 Trafford Council election
 2004 Tunbridge Wells Council election
 2004 Wakefield Council election
 2004 Watford Council election
 2004 Welwyn Hatfield Council election
 2004 West Lancashire Council election
 2004 West Lindsey Council election
 2004 Weymouth and Portland Council election
 2004 Wigan Council election
 2004 Winchester Council election
 2004 Wirral Council election
 2004 Woking Council election
 2004 Wokingham Council election
 2004 Wolverhampton Council election
 2004 Worcester Council election
 2004 Worthing Council election
 2004 Wyre Forest Council election

North America
 2004 Panamanian general election
 2004 Salvadoran presidential election

Canada
 2004 Canadian federal election
 2004 Alberta Senate nominee election
 Alberta Student Vote, 2004
 2004 Alberta general election
 2004 Conservative Party of Canada leadership election
 2004 New Brunswick municipal elections
 2004 Halifax Regional Municipality municipal election
 2004 Nunavut general election
 2004 Progressive Conservative Party of Ontario leadership election
 2004 Quebec provincial by-elections

Alberta municipal
 2004 Calgary municipal election
 2004 Edmonton municipal election

Caribbean
 2004 Antigua and Barbuda general election
 2004 Dominican Republic presidential election
 2004 Saint Kitts and Nevis general election

Puerto Rican
 2004 Puerto Rican general election

Mexico
 2004 Mexican elections
 2004 Chihuahua state election
 2004 Durango state election
 2004 Oaxaca state election
 2004 Zacatecas state election

Puerto Rican
 2004 Puerto Rican general election

United States
 2004 United States presidential election
 2004 United States House of Representatives elections
 2004 United States Senate elections
 2004 United States elections

United States gubernatorial
 2004 United States gubernatorial elections
 2004 Delaware gubernatorial election
 2004 Indiana gubernatorial election
 2004 Missouri lieutenant gubernatorial election
 2004 Missouri gubernatorial election
 2004 Montana gubernatorial election
 2004 New Hampshire gubernatorial election
 2004 North Carolina gubernatorial election
 2004 North Dakota gubernatorial election
 2004 Utah gubernatorial election
 2004 Vermont gubernatorial election
 2004 Washington gubernatorial election
 2004 West Virginia gubernatorial election

United States mayoral
 2004 Jersey City mayoral special election

Alabama
 2004 Alabama elections
 2004 Alabama Democratic presidential primary
 2004 United States Senate election in Alabama
 2004 United States presidential election in Alabama

Alaska
 2004 United States presidential election in Alaska
 2004 United States Senate election in Alaska

American Samoa
 2004 American Samoan general election

Arizona
 2004 Arizona Democratic presidential primary
 2004 Arizona Proposition 200
 Maricopa County Sheriff's Office
 2004 United States Senate election in Arizona
 2004 United States presidential election in Arizona
 Wisconsin Democratic primary, 2004

Arkansas
 2004 United States Senate election in Arkansas
 2004 United States presidential election in Arkansas

California
 2004 California state elections
 2004 California Democratic presidential primary
 2004 California Republican presidential primary
 2004 San Francisco Board of Supervisors elections
 March 2004 San Francisco general elections
 November 2004 San Francisco general elections
 2004 California State Senate elections
 2004 California State Assembly elections

California congressional
 2004 United States Senate election in California

Colorado
 United States Senate election in Colorado, 2004

Connecticut
 United States presidential election in Connecticut, 2004
 United States Senate election in Connecticut, 2004

Delaware
 Delaware Democratic primary, 2004
 2004 Delaware gubernatorial election
 United States presidential election in Delaware, 2004

Florida
 United States Senate election in Florida, 2004
 United States presidential election in Florida, 2004

Georgia (U.S. state)
 United States House of Representatives elections in Georgia, 2004
 United States Senate election in Georgia, 2004
 United States presidential election in Georgia, 2004

Guam
 2004 Guamanian general election

Hawaii
 United States Senate election in Hawaii, 2004
 United States presidential election in Hawaii, 2004

Indiana
 2004 Indiana gubernatorial election
 United States presidential election in Indiana, 2004
 United States Senate election in Indiana, 2004

Iowa
 Iowa Democratic caucuses, 2004
 United States presidential election in Iowa, 2004
 United States Senate election in Iowa, 2004

Kansas
 United States Senate election in Kansas, 2004
 United States presidential election in Kansas, 2004

Kentucky
 2004 Kentucky's 6th congressional district special election
 United States presidential election in Kentucky, 2004
 United States House of Representatives elections in Kentucky, 2004
 United States Senate election in Kentucky, 2004

Louisiana
 United States presidential election in Louisiana, 2004
 United States Senate election in Louisiana, 2004

Maine
 Maine Democratic caucuses, 2004
 United States presidential election in Maine, 2004

Maryland
 Maryland Democratic primary, 2004
 United States Senate election in Maryland, 2004
 United States presidential election in Maryland, 2004

Massachusetts
 United States presidential election in Massachusetts, 2004
 2004 Massachusetts Senate elections

Michigan
 Michigan Democratic caucuses, 2004
 United States presidential election in Michigan, 2004

Minnesota
 United States presidential election in Minnesota, 2004

Missouri
 Missouri Democratic primary, 2004
 2004 Missouri gubernatorial election
 2004 Missouri Lieutenant gubernatorial election
 United States presidential election in Missouri, 2004
 Missouri Republican primary, 2004
 2004 United States Senate election in Missouri

Montana
 2004 Montana gubernatorial election
 United States presidential election in Montana, 2004

Nebraska
 United States presidential election in Nebraska, 2004

Nevada
 Nevada Democratic caucuses, 2004
 United States presidential election in Nevada, 2004
 United States Senate election in Nevada, 2004

New Hampshire
 New Hampshire Democratic primary, 2004
 2004 New Hampshire gubernatorial election
 2004 New Hampshire state elections
 United States Senate election in New Hampshire, 2004
 United States presidential election in New Hampshire, 2004

New Jersey
 2004 Jersey City mayoral special election
 New Jersey Democratic primary, 2004
 United States presidential election in New Jersey, 2004

New Mexico
 New Mexico Democratic caucuses, 2004
 United States presidential election in New Mexico, 2004

North Carolina
 2004 North Carolina judicial elections
 2004 North Carolina lieutenant governor election
 2004 North Carolina Council of State elections
 2004 North Carolina General Assembly election
 United States House of Representatives elections in North Carolina, 2004
 United States Senate election in North Carolina, 2004
 United States presidential election in North Carolina, 2004

North Dakota
 North Dakota Democratic caucuses, 2004
 2004 North Dakota gubernatorial election
 United States presidential election in North Dakota, 2004
 United States Senate election in North Dakota, 2004

Ohio
 United States presidential election in Ohio, 2004
 United States Senate election in Ohio, 2004

Oklahoma
 Oklahoma Democratic primary, 2004
 United States presidential election in Oklahoma, 2004
 United States Senate election in Oklahoma, 2004

Oregon
 United States presidential election in Oregon, 2004
 United States Senate election in Oregon, 2004

Pennsylvania
 2004 Pennsylvania Attorney General election
 2004 Pennsylvania Auditor General election
 Pennsylvania Democratic primary, 2004
 2004 Pennsylvania House of Representatives elections
 2004 Pennsylvania Senate elections
 2004 Pennsylvania state elections
 2004 Pennsylvania State Treasurer election
 United States presidential election in Pennsylvania, 2004
 United States House of Representatives elections in Pennsylvania, 2004
 United States Senate election in Pennsylvania, 2004

Puerto Rican
 2004 Puerto Rican general election

Rhode Island
 United States presidential election in Rhode Island, 2004

South Carolina
 United States presidential election in South Carolina, 2004
 South Carolina Democratic primary, 2004
 United States Senate election in South Carolina, 2004

South Dakota
 United States House of Representatives elections in South Dakota, 2004
 United States presidential election in South Dakota, 2004
 United States Senate election in South Dakota, 2004

Tennessee
 United States presidential election in Tennessee, 2004
 Tennessee Democratic primary, 2004

Texas
 United States House of Representatives elections in Texas, 2004
 United States presidential election in Texas, 2004

United States House of Representatives
 2004 United States House of Representatives elections
 United States House of Representatives elections in California, 2004
 United States House of Representatives elections in Georgia, 2004
 United States House of Representatives elections in Indiana, 2004
 United States House of Representatives elections in Kentucky, 2004
 2004 Kentucky's 6th congressional district special election
 United States House of Representatives elections in New York, 2004
 2004 North Carolina's 1st congressional district special election
 United States House of Representatives election in North Dakota, 2004
 United States House of Representatives elections in South Carolina, 2004
 United States House of Representatives elections in South Dakota, 2004
 United States House of Representatives elections in Texas, 2004
 United States House of Representatives elections in Washington, 2004

United States Senate
 2004 United States Senate elections
 United States Senate election in Alabama, 2004
 United States Senate election in Alaska, 2004
 United States Senate election in Arizona, 2004
 United States Senate election in Arkansas, 2004
 United States Senate election in California, 2004
 United States Senate election in Colorado, 2004
 United States Senate election in Connecticut, 2004
 United States Senate election in Florida, 2004
 United States Senate election in Georgia, 2004
 United States Senate election in Idaho, 2004
 United States Senate election in Illinois, 2004
 United States Senate election in Indiana, 2004
 United States Senate election in Iowa, 2004
 United States Senate election in Kansas, 2004
 United States Senate election in Kentucky, 2004
 United States Senate election in Louisiana, 2004
 United States Senate election in Maryland, 2004
 2004 United States Senate election in Missouri
 United States Senate election in Nevada, 2004
 United States Senate election in New Hampshire, 2004
 United States Senate election in North Carolina, 2004
 United States Senate election in North Dakota, 2004
 United States Senate election in Ohio, 2004
 United States Senate election in Oklahoma, 2004
 United States Senate election in Oregon, 2004
 United States Senate election in Pennsylvania, 2004
 United States Senate election in South Carolina, 2004
 United States Senate election in South Dakota, 2004
 United States Senate election in Utah, 2004
 United States Senate election in Vermont, 2004
 United States Senate election in Washington, 2004
 United States Senate election in Wisconsin, 2004

Utah
 United States presidential election in Utah, 2004
 United States Senate election in Utah, 2004
 2004 Utah gubernatorial election

Washington (U.S. state)
 2004 Washington State Executive elections
 United States presidential election in Washington, 2004
 2004 Washington State Supreme Court elections
 United States House of Representatives elections in Washington, 2004
 United States Senate election in Washington, 2004
 2004 Washington attorney general election
 2004 Washington gubernatorial election
 Washington Initiative 872 (2004)
 2004 Washington secretary of state election
 2004 Washington State Senate elections
 Washington ballot measures, 2004

Washington, D.C.
 District of Columbia Democratic primary, 2004
 United States presidential election in the District of Columbia, 2004

West Virginia
 United States presidential election in West Virginia, 2004
 2004 West Virginia gubernatorial election

Wyoming
 United States presidential election in Wyoming, 2004

Oceania
 2004 American Samoan general election
 2004 Cook Islands general election
 2004 French Polynesian legislative election
 2003 Nauruan parliamentary election
 2004 Nauruan parliamentary election
 2004 New Caledonian legislative election
 2004 Palauan general election
 2004 Pitcairn Islands general election
 2004 Vanuatuan general election

American Samoa
 2004 American Samoan general election

Australia
 2004 Australian Capital Territory general election
 2004 Australian federal election
 2004 Dubbo state by-election
 'Not happy, John!' campaign
 2004 Queensland state election
 2004 Results of the Australian federal election

Guam
 2004 Guamanian general election

Hawaii
 United States Senate election in Hawaii, 2004
 United States presidential election in Hawaii, 2004

New Zealand
 2004 Dunedin mayoral election
 2004 New Zealand local elections
 2004 Te Tai Hauauru by-election
 2004 Wellington City mayoral election

South America
 2004 Bolivian gas referendum
 2004 Brazilian municipal elections
 2004 Venezuelan recall referendum
 2004 Venezuelan regional elections

See also

 
2004
Elections